Perry Suckling (born 12 October 1965, in Leyton) is an English former footballer who played as a goalkeeper and is currently academy and goalkeeping coach at Tottenham Hotspur.

Coaching career

In  2015 he was appointed academy manager at Queens Park Rangers. He stayed in this post for two seasons before making the switch  to Tottenham Hotspur in 2017 to become the academy and goalkeeping coach.

Honours

 Hong Kong Viceroy Cup : 1992 (Ernest Borel)
 Hong Kong FA Cup : 1992 (Ernest Borel)
 Division 2 Playoff winner: 1989 (Crystal Palace)

References

External links

1965 births
Living people
People from Leyton
English footballers
England under-21 international footballers
Association football goalkeepers
Coventry City F.C. players
Manchester City F.C. players
Crystal Palace F.C. players
West Ham United F.C. players
Brentford F.C. players
Sea Bee players
Watford F.C. players
Bidvest Wits F.C. players
SuperSport United F.C. players
Dagenham & Redbridge F.C. players
King's Lynn F.C. players
Doncaster Rovers F.C. players
English Football League players
Hong Kong First Division League players
Norwich City F.C. non-playing staff
Tottenham Hotspur F.C. non-playing staff
Queens Park Rangers F.C. non-playing staff
Expatriate footballers in Hong Kong
Expatriate soccer players in South Africa
Association football coaches
Footballers from the London Borough of Waltham Forest
Association football goalkeeping coaches